Miltiadis "Miltos" Papapostolou (9 September 1935 – 2 February 2017) was a Greek professional footballer and manager.

Club career
Papapostolou started his career at Omvros Omvriakis, where in 1951 he joined Egaleo. He played there for 5 seasons and joined AEK Athens in 1956 with a two-year ban, as it was applied at the time when a player was transferred, without the approval of his club. Papapostolou was a key player of the club in winning the championship in 1963, while he also won the Cup in the following season. He left AEK in the summer of 1965, where he retired as a footballer, at the age of 31.

Managerial career
Papapostolou started his coaching career in 1972 at the bench of Egaleo until 1975. He also worked in clubs of smaller categories, such as Atromitos, Marko, Ierapoli, Korinthos, Acharnaikos, Koropi, Panelefsiniakos and until December 1979. In February 1980 he replaced Hermann Stessl on the AEK Athens, where they finished in the 4th place, left out of the European competitions of the next season. In the following season, the president Loukas Barlos, renewed his contract. AEK finished second behind Olympiacos and in the Cup he reached the semi-finals where they were eliminated by PAOK. After a spell at Kallithea, he took charge of the bench of Greece from 1984 to 1988. In 1989 he had a 3-month spell at Olympiacos. The following season he signed with Levadiakos until 1991. In February 1992, Papapostolou took over the technical leadership of Athinaikos, where he stayed until the end of the season. In February 1993 he sat at the bench of Proodeftiki for a short period.

After football
Papapostolou was for a number of years the president of the Greek Football Coaches Association, with important reforms for the industry. He died on 2 February 2017, at the age of 81.

Honours

As a player

AEK Athens
Alpha Ethniki: 1962–63
Greek Cup: 1963–64

References

1935 births
2017 deaths
Greek footballers
Greek football managers
Egaleo F.C. players
AEK Athens F.C. players
Egaleo F.C. managers
AEK Athens F.C. managers
Atromitos F.C. managers
Olympiacos F.C. managers
Levadiakos F.C. managers
Athinaikos F.C. managers
Proodeftiki F.C. managers
Greece national football team managers
People from Phthiotis
Association football defenders
Association football midfielders
Footballers from Central Greece